Erinnyis oenotrus, the Oenotrus sphinx, is a moth of the  family Sphingidae.

Distribution 
It is found in tropical and subtropical lowlands in Paraguay, Brazil, Bolivia and Argentina, north through Central America, Mexico and the West Indies. Occasional strays have been recorded from Florida and southern Texas.

Description

References

Erinnyis
Moths described in 1780